Nany may refer to:

People
 Nany Dimata (born 1997), Belgian football player
 Nany Peña, Dominican actress
 Nany Basuki (born 1970), Indonesian tennis player

Other
 La Nany, Chilean sitcom

See also
 Nanny